Hosen (also Romanized as Ḩoşen, Ḩoşn, and Ḩeşn; also known as Hesan and Qaryeh-ye Ḩeşn) is a village in Jorjafak Rural District, in the Central District of Zarand County, Kerman Province, Iran. At the 2006 census, its population was 103, in 38 families.

References 

Populated places in Zarand County